Hurricane Donna, known in Puerto Rico as Hurricane San Lorenzo, was the strongest hurricane of the 1960 Atlantic hurricane season, and caused severe damage to the Lesser Antilles, the Greater Antilles, and the East Coast of the United States, especially Florida, in August–September. The fifth tropical cyclone, third hurricane, and first major hurricane of the season, Donna developed south of Cape Verde on August 29, spawned by a tropical wave to which 63 deaths from a plane crash in Senegal were attributed. The depression strengthened into Tropical Storm Donna by the following day. Thereafter, it maintained intensity as it struck the Lesser Antilles later that day. On Sint Maarten, the storm left a quarter of the island's population homeless and killed seven people. An additional five deaths were reported in Anguilla, and there were seven other fatalities throughout the Virgin Islands. In Puerto Rico, severe flash flooding led to 107 fatalities, 85 of them in Humacao alone.

Donna further intensified to a Category 4 hurricane early on September 6, and attained peak winds of  twenty-four hours later. The storm then weakened over the next few days, making multiple landfalls in The Bahamas as a Category 3 hurricane. Several small island communities in the southern regions of The Bahamas were leveled, but no damage total or fatalities were reported.

As it neared the United States, Donna encountered weaker steering currents, turned northwestward, and re-intensified. In the Florida Keys, coastal flooding severely damaged 75% of buildings, destroyed several subdivisions in Marathon. On the mainland, 5,200 houses were damaged, which does not include the 75% of homes damaged at Fort Myers Beach; 50% of buildings were also destroyed in the city of Everglades. Crop losses were also extensive. A total of 50% of the grapefruit crop was lost, 10% of the orange and tangerine crop was lost, and the avocado crop was almost destroyed. In the state of Florida alone, there were 13 deaths and $300 million in losses.

Donna weakened over Florida and was a Category 1 hurricane when it re-emerged into the Atlantic from North Florida. By early on September 12, the storm made landfall near Topsail Beach, North Carolina, as a Category 2 hurricane. Additionally, storm surge caused significant beach erosion and structural damage at Wilmington and Nags Head. Eight people were killed and there were over 100 injuries. Later on September 12, Donna reemerged into the Atlantic Ocean and continued to move northeastward. The storm struck Long Island, New York, late on September 12 and rapidly weakened inland. On the following day, Donna became extratropical over Maine.

Meteorological history

On August 29, a tropical wave exited the west coast of Africa near Dakar. That day, it is estimated a tropical depression developed along the wave southeast of Cape Verde. There was a lack of data for several days, but it is estimated that the system gradually intensified. It is estimated that the storm attained hurricane status a day prior. The Azores High to the north was unusually powerful, which caused Donna to move to the west-northwest. When advisories began, Donna was intensifying into a major hurricane, which is the equivalent of a Category 3 or higher on the Saffir-Simpson hurricane wind scale; it would ultimately maintain this status for nearly eight days.

Operationally, winds were estimated to be . Late on September 4, the eye of Donna moved over Barbuda, Saint Barthélemy, Saint Martin, and Anguilla, and passed just south of Anegada. Donna was then well-organized, described in the Monthly Weather Review as akin to "an intense, idealized hurricane." A weakening trough to the north turned the hurricane more northwesterly, bringing it within  of the north coast of Puerto Rico. At that time, Donna began turning more to the west as a ridge built to its north, and it soon weakened back to Category 3 status. Over the next few days, the intense hurricane moved slowly through the southern Bahamas without defined steering currents, and the eye passed near or over Mayaguana, Acklins, Fortune Island, and Ragged Island.

While passing through the Straits of Florida, Donna brushed the northern coast of Cuba on September 9 with gale-force winds. Subsequently, a cold front moved eastward through the United States and weakened the ridge, causing the hurricane to turn more to the northwest. Donna then traversed Naples and Fort Myers before turning inland to the northeast.

On September 13, Donna became extratropical over northern Maine before entering eastern Canada, having become associated with the approaching cold front. After moving across Quebec and Labrador, Donna reached the Labrador Sea and dissipated early on September 14.

Preparations
At noon on September 3, a hurricane watch was issued for the Leeward Islands, which at 6 p.m. was upgraded to a warning. Also at 6 p.m., hurricane watches were raised for Puerto Rico and the Virgin Islands, which at 6 a.m. on September 4, were upgraded to warnings. By 6 a.m. on September 5, hurricane warnings were dropped for the Leeward Islands, and at 9 a.m., southwest Puerto Rico and the Virgin Island's hurricane warnings were downgraded to gale warnings. By noon, all remaining hurricane warnings for Puerto Rico were changed to gale warnings. In Puerto Rico, flood warnings were issued on September 5, although some residents in the region did not heed the notice; many returned to their homes after the hurricane passed to the north. On Vieques Island, about 1,700 United States Marines evacuated to naval ships. Officials advised small boats to remain at port, and thousands of residents evacuated to schools set up as Red Cross shelters. Along the Cuban coast, about 3,000 people evacuated inland or to churches and schools; while in the Bahamas, stores closed and boats were sent to port.

Beginning on September 7, hurricane watches were put in place for the Florida coast from Key West to Melbourne. The next day, the watches were upgraded to hurricane warnings from Key West to Key Largo, with hurricane watches raised on the west coast northward to Fort Myers, and gale warnings issued from Key Largo to Vero Beach. By September 11, hurricane warnings were in effect for southern Florida from Daytona Beach on the east coast to Cedar Key on the west coast, including Lake Okeechobee. Gale warnings were in place northward from Cedar Key to St. Marks, as well as from Daytona Beach northward to Savannah, Georgia. Evacuations in the Florida Keys disrupted traffic along the Overseas Highway. The Air Force evacuated 90 Boeing B-47 Stratojets from Homestead Air Reserve Base (At that time Homestead AFB). At Cape Canaveral, the threat of the storm caused the launching of two missiles to be postponed. Most flights out of Miami International Airport were canceled during the storm's approach. Officials closed schools in Miami and the Florida Keys, and recommended residents in low-lying areas of the Florida Keys and southwestern Florida to evacuate. Ultimately, about 12,000 people in southern Florida sought refuge in storm shelters, two of which were damaged during the storm. In Miami-Dade County alone, there were 77 storm shelters housing 10,000 people.

At 5 p.m. on September 10, gale warnings were extended northward to Myrtle Beach. At 11 p.m., hurricane warnings were lowered in the Florida Keys but extended northward from Daytona Beach to Savannah, Georgia. At 11 a.m. on September 11, all warnings were lowered south of Vero Beach and along the Florida west coast, while hurricane warnings were extended northward from Savannah to Myrtle Beach. At 5 p.m., hurricane warnings were lowered south of Fernandina Beach, while they were extended northward to include the entire North Carolina coast. Gale warnings were issued northward to Cape May. At 9 p.m., hurricane warnings were extended northward to Portsmouth, New Hampshire, while gale warnings and a hurricane watch were issued northward to Eastport, Maine. Ships at dock in Newport, Rhode Island were towed out into the bay to weather the storm. On September 12 at 5 a.m., hurricane warnings were extended northward to Eastport, and dropped south of Cape Hatteras. At 7 a.m., hurricane warnings were lowered south of Cape Charles. At 2 p.m., hurricane warnings were dropped south of Cape May. At 5 p.m., hurricane warnings were discontinued south of Manasquan, New Jersey. At 8 p.m., hurricane warnings expired south of Block Island. By 11 p.m. on September 12, all hurricane warnings had been lowered.

Impact

Hurricane Donna was a very destructive hurricane that caused extensive damage from the Lesser Antilles to New England. At least 364 people were killed by the hurricane and property damage was estimated at $900 million (1960 USD).

West Africa
The precursor to Hurricane Donna brought severe weather to the Dakar area of Senegal. Air France Flight 343, which was flying from Paris, France to Abidjan, Ivory Coast, attempted to land at the Léopold Sédar Senghor International Airport as a layover. However, due to squally weather, the plane instead crashed into the Atlantic Ocean, killing all 63 people on board. Heavy rainfall was also reported in Cape Verde on August 30.

Caribbean
Hurricane Donna caused very extensive damage on Saint-Martin, killed 7 and left at least a quarter of the island's population homeless.
Donna killed two people on Antigua. During the passing of Hurricane Donna, Anguilla recorded five deaths, including a woman who died when the roof of her house collapsed.

Some fences were toppled, while several houses were reported to have been damaged or destroyed. Electrical and telephone services were also disrupted. On Saint John, several small boats capsized.

The hurricane left about 2,500 people homeless on the island. Despite advanced warning of the floods, the hurricane killed 107 people on the island, of which 84 were in Humacao.

In Haiti, the southern periphery of the hurricane killed three people in Port au Prince. Later, Donna brushed the north coast of Cuba with strong winds and heavy rainfall, causing damage along much of the coast. In Gibara, the storm wrecked 80 houses.

Turks and Caicos and Bahamas
Despite the rains, damage there was minor.

In the Bahamas, the anemometer at Ragged Island blew away after registering a  wind gust. At Mayaguana, where residents evacuated to a missile tracking base, hurricane-force winds raged for 13 hours. The winds largely destroyed the village of Abraham's Bay on the island. Andros experienced hurricane-force winds for a few hours, and winds on Fortune Island were estimated at  before the anemometer blew away. The strongest winds remained south of the northwestern Bahamas, which limited damage there. Donna cut communications between several islands.

Several small island communities in the southern Bahamas were leveled. North Caicos reported  of rainfall in 24 hours.

United States
There were 50 people reported dead in the United States, with damages totaling to $3.35 billion. Donna crossed directly over United States Air Force radar station Texas Tower 4, causing severe damage to the structure and leading to its eventual loss in January 1961.

Donna was the only hurricane to affect every state along the East Coast with hurricane-force winds.

Florida

The U.S. state of Florida received the most damage from Hurricane Donna. In Miami, winds reached . Southeast of the city, high waves washed a  freighter onshore an island.

In the Florida Keys, some areas experienced "almost complete destruction". In Key West, one death was confirmed, and 71 people were injured. About 564 homes were demolished, and an additional 1,382 were damaged, 583 of them severely. Farther north, an estimated 75% of buildings were extensively damaged between Marathon and Tavernier. In the former, tides inundated the city and destroyed several subdivisions. Storm surge inundated parts of the Overseas Highway. Six bridges between Marathon and Craig Key had been nearly or entirely swept away. Many boats and docks were severely damaged or destroyed. Additionally, the pipeline supplying water to the Florida Keys was wrecked in three places.

In Miami-Dade County (then Dade County), thousands of low-lying homes in the Homestead area were flooded. The storm also overturned 25 mobile homes and caused one death in the city. While telephone service remained mostly uninterrupted, approximately 152,000 people lost electricity. Donna was the first hurricane to affect Miami, Florida, since Hurricane King in October 1950. Although structural damage in and around Miami was generally light, winds shattered windows and uprooted trees. Heavy precipitation inundated streets. Overall, 857 houses in Dade County were destroyed, while about 2,317 others suffered damage. Significant agricultural losses were also reported. About 100 homes in Broward County reported minor damage. In Boca Raton and Delray Beach, damage was mostly limited to downed billboard signs and shattered windows. Storm surge covered State Road A1A with mud and sand. In North Palm Beach, winds shattered a few windows and destroyed a shopping center sign. A fire destroyed a cocktail lounge in Juno Beach after response teams were unable to extinguish the blaze due to high winds.

Large tracts of mangrove forest were lost in the western portion of Everglades National Park, while at least 35% of the white heron population in the park were killed. The lodge and marina at Flamingo, as well as a ranger's way station near Cape Sable, were virtually destroyed. In Everglades City, about 50% of buildings were destroyed due to strong winds and coastal flooding, and roofs were blown off or damaged. The city briefly became inaccessible due to inundated roads. Thousands of trees were toppled, blocking portions of the Tamiami Trail. Approximately half of the homes in Chokoloskee were destroyed, while floodwaters entered a number of homes in Ochopee. The community of Immokalee reported about $3 million in damage. In Naples, storm surge entered many high-priced homes, while the  fishing pier was wrecked. A total of 19 cottages and 12 mobile homes at Gordon Pass were damaged beyond repairs. Throughout Naples, Donna demolished 87 homes and damaged 614 others in Everglades City. The Miami News described Vanderbilt Beach as being reduced to "another welter of splintered homes." Throughout Collier County, strong winds and coastal flooding combined destroyed 153 homes, severely damaged 409 others, and caused minor damage to 1,049 dwellings.

Donna left about $3 million in property damage and two deaths in Fort Myers. A new church in Bradenton was destroyed, while much of the city was left without power. In Winter Haven, 13 homes were destroyed, 100 others suffered major damage, and 2,400 dwellings experienced minor damage. One person was killed in the city. The turn into southern Florida lessened damage in the Tampa area. High winds deroofed in armory building in Dade City sheltering 150 people. In Volusia County, Donna destroyed 10 homes, severely damaged 112 homes, and caused minor damage to 1,100 others, while 25 buildings were demolished, 400 substantially damaged, and inflicted minor damage to 750 others. One fatality occurred in the county.

Throughout the state of Florida, the storm destroyed 2,156 homes and trailers, severely damaged 3,903, and inflicted minor impact on 30,524 others. Approximately 391 farm buildings were destroyed, an additional 989 suffered extensive impact, and 2,499 others received minor damage. Roughly 174 buildings were demolished, 1,029 received major impact, and 4,254 suffered minor damage. Additionally, 281 boats were destroyed or severely damaged. A total of 50% of grapefruit crop was lost, 10% of the orange and tangerine crops were ruined, and the avocado crop was almost destroyed. With at least $350 million in damage in Florida alone, Donna was the costliest hurricane to impact the state, at the time. Additionally, there were 14 confirmed fatalities: six from drowning, four from heart attacks, two from automobile accidents, and two from electrocution. About 1,188 others were injured.

Southeastern United States and Mid-Atlantic

The storm brought minor impact to Georgia. Wind gusts of  along the coast felled trees and tree limbs, resulting in electrical and telephone-service outages. In Brunswick, GA, a power outage at the power plant caused a minor explosion. Heavy rainfall temporarily flooded some streets in the city. Further north in South Carolina, gale-force winds were reported along the coast, but caused little damage. An F3 tornado struck areas just north of Downtown Charleston, destroying several houses and severely damaging a number of others. There were 10 injuries, some of which were caused by flying glass. Damage from this tornado was over $500,000. An F1 tornado also touched down in Garden City Beach, destroying or extensively damaging six buildings. In Beaufort County, many trees were uprooted, power lines were downed, homes were unroofed, piers were destroyed, and there was significant damage to corn and soybean crops.

In North Carolina, Donna brought two tornadoes to the state. An F1 tornado damaged several small buildings in Bladen County. An F2 tornado in Sampson County destroyed a dwelling with eight occupants, all of whom were hospitalized. Along the coast, wind gusts as high as  damaged or destroyed several buildings. Additionally, Topsail Beach was reported to have been 50% destroyed. In Southport, the town docks were almost completely demolished. There were eight deaths, including three from drowning, two from falling trees, two from weather-related traffic accidents, and one from electrocution. At least 100 people were injured enough to require hospitalization. Damage in North Carolina exceeded $5 million, with the worst impact occurring in New Hanover County.

Strong winds toppled trees and electrical wires, which blocked streets. Additionally, buildings suffered roof damage and broken windows; some structures were completely destroyed. Offshore, rough seas sank or destroyed numerous small crafts, while a  vessel was driven aground. The storm killed three people in Virginia; two of the deaths occurred when a barge collided with a freighter and later sank, and another after a man attempted to safeguard his boat. Strong winds and heavy rains were observed in eastern Maryland. Ocean City suffered the worst impact, with over $300,000 in property damage. The storm also damaged crops in the area, especially corn and apples. Effects from the storm in Delaware were similar, with property damage and considerable losses to corn and apple crops. Heavy rains and poor drainage in some areas flooded basements, lawns, and streets. One death in the state was reported after a boy was swept into a swollen creek behind his home in Sharon Hill.

Damage from the storm was most severe in Atlantic, Cape May, Monmouth, and Ocean counties, where numerous boats, docks, boardwalks, and cottages were damaged or destroyed. A resort area in Cliffwood Beach, New Jersey saw its boardwalk and tourist attractions destroyed by the hurricane, and the area has never recovered. Losses to agriculture were significant, with damage to apple and peach trees "considerable", the former of which lost about one-third of its crops. Wind damage to corn, Sudan grass, and sorghum resulted in a delay in their harvest. Nine deaths were reported in the state of New Jersey. In southeastern New York, the eye of Donna crossed 10 miles to the eastern tip of Long Island. Heavy rains, hurricane-force winds, and "unprecedented" high tides were observed. Severe small stream flooding caused significant damage, especially on Long Island, the waterfront of New York City, and further north in Greene County. The storm caused three fatalities in the state, two from drowning and another from a person crushed by a falling tree.

The eye of Hurricane Donna crossed near the Connecticut and Rhode Island state line, thus much of the damage in Connecticut was in far eastern sections. Strong winds left 15,000 people without telephone service, while 88,000 homes lost electricity. Along the coast, tides caused beach erosion, inundated streets, and weakened foundations. Four seaside cottages were destroyed. Crop damage was isolated and mainly limited to apples and corn. Telephone and electrical services were severely disrupted. Along the coast, high tides significantly damaged or destroyed about 200 homes at Narragansett Bay and Warwick cove. Damage to these vessels collectively totaled to over $2 million. Agriculture also suffered impact, particularly to fruit, timber, and poultry, especially in Newport and Portsmouth.

Elsewhere in North America

Extensive losses to apple orchards occurred, as the fruit was blown out of trees. Widespread telephone and power outages were reported. The strong southwest winds associated with Donna, in combination with very little rainfall, led to a significant deposit of salt spray, which whitewashed southwest-facing windows. Many trees and shrubs saw their leaves brown due to the salt. However, in other areas,  of precipitation fell, causing some washouts and local flooding. Waves along the coast ripped small boats and pleasure craft from their moorings and subsequently smashed them against rocks or seawalls.

In Vermont, winds damaged trees, tree branches, and power lines, causing telephone and electrical service outages in a few communities. Rainfall totals ranged , resulting in washouts in some areas. Damage to apple orchards totaled $50,000. Along the coast of New Hampshire, many boats were smashed or damaged in some way. Strong winds felled trees and power lines, causing residents in the southern portions of the state to lose telephone service and electricity. Additionally, apple orchards suffered $200,000 in damage. Rainfall in the state peaked at  near Peterborough, resulting in local flooding and washouts.

Along the coast, large waves damaged 15 to 20 boats in Falmouth, Maine harbor. Total boat damage was estimated at $250,000. Coastal residents in low-lying beach areas of Cumberland and York counties were evacuated in Maine. Several counties lost power during the storm. In Southwest Harbor, lightning struck the Dirigo Hotel, causing a fire that resulted in $100,000 in damages. Winds caused a loss of telephone and electrical services in the Auburn-Lewiston area due to falling trees or tree branches. Television antennas were damaged, as were several signs, including a Sears sign. In addition, 25% to 40% of the apple crop was destroyed.

After becoming extratropical, the remnants of Donna continued northeastward into New Brunswick, Quebec, and then Labrador. One death occurred when a man suffered a heart attack when his home was threatened by a fire. Additionally, weather-related traffic accidents in the province resulted in two injuries.

Depictions in popular culture
Nobel Prize-winner John Steinbeck wrote about Hurricane Donna in his 1962 non-fiction memoir Travels with Charley: In Search of America. Steinbeck had had a truck fitted with a custom camper-shell for a journey he intended to take across the United States, accompanied by his poodle Charley. He planned on leaving after Labor Day from his home in Sag Harbor, Long Island, New York. Steinbeck delayed his trip slightly due to Donna, which made a direct hit on Long Island. Steinbeck wrote of saving his boat during the middle of the hurricane, during which he jumped into the water and was blown to shore clinging to a fallen branch driven by the high winds. It was an exploit which foreshadowed his fearless, or even reckless, state of mind to dive into the unknown.

The winds of Donna can be seen in the feature film Blast of Silence (1961); the final scenes on Long Island had been previously scheduled, and the filmmakers decided to go ahead and shoot the exterior scene despite the hurricane.

Aftermath, records and retirement

Following the storm, President of the United States Dwight D. Eisenhower issued a disaster declaration for Florida and North Carolina, allowing residents of those states to be eligible for public assistance.

The United States military sent a plane carrying doctors and food from Patrick Air Force Base to Mayaguana in the Bahamas. Crews of doctors and workers with food and supplies left from Key West and Miami to traverse the Florida Keys, bringing aid to affected residents. In Marathon, a large reconstruction program rehabilitated the key by Christmas.

Coral reefs were damaged in the Key Largo National Marine Sanctuary by the hurricane. Donna caused a significant negative impact on aquatic life in north Florida Bay. Marine life was either stranded by retreating salt water which had been driven inland or killed by muddied waters in its wake. Oxygen depletion due to animals perishing in the hurricane caused additional mortality. Although salinity levels returned to normal within six weeks, dissolved oxygen concentrations remained quite low for a longer time frame. Marine life was scarce for several months in areas of greatest oxygen depletion. Sports fishing in the area took a few months to recover. A Caspian tern was swept up the North American coast well to the north of its traditional breeding grounds, to Nova Scotia, which was witnessed four hours after the storm went by Digby Neck.

Because of its devastating impacts and the high mortality associated with the hurricane, the name Donna was retired, and will never again be used for an Atlantic hurricane; the name was replaced by Dora in 1964.

See also

 List of Category 4 Atlantic hurricanes
 List of Delaware hurricanes
 List of disasters in the United States by death toll
 List of Florida hurricanes (1950–74)
 List of New England hurricanes
 List of New York hurricanes
 List of North Carolina hurricanes (1950–79)
 List of wettest tropical cyclones in Massachusetts
 Hurricane Luis (1995) – similarly strong hurricane that struck the northeastern Caribbean Sea, but subsequently turned out to sea
 Hurricane Charley (2004) – similar track across I-4 corridor
 Hurricane Wilma (2005) – also caused major damage in southern Florida along a southwest to northeast track
 Hurricane Irma (2017) – another intense hurricane with a similar track in Florida
 Hurricane Isaias (2020) – similarly affected the entire east coast of the United States
 Hurricane Ian (2022) - a storm with a similar track, particularly through the Florida Peninsula

References

External links

Images of Donna, Naples Daily News, Naples, Fla.
Historic Images of Florida Hurricanes, Florida State Archives
Donna, NOAA Hurricane Research Division
Donna, HPC Rainfall Page

Donna
Donna
Donna
Donna
Donna
Donna
Donna
Donna
Donna
Donna
Donna
Donna
Donna
Donna
Donna
Donna
Donna
Donna
Donna
Donna
Donna
Donna
Donna
Donna
Donna
Donna
Donna
Donna
Donna
1960 in the Caribbean
1960 meteorology
1960 natural disasters
Articles containing video clips
1960 natural disasters in the United States
Saint Christopher-Nevis-Anguilla
History of British Antigua and Barbuda